The Pioneer is a 2021 Chinese biographical historical drama directed by Xu Zhanxiong and produced by Guan Hu, starring Zhang Songwen as Li Dazhao, a pioneer to spread Marxism and Communism in China and one of the founders of the Chinese Communist Party. The rest of the main cast includes Li Yifeng, Tong Liya, Peng Yuchang, and Qin Hao. The film premiered in China on 1 July 2021, to commemorate the 100th anniversary of the Chinese Communist Party.

Cast 
 Zhang Songwen as Li Dazhao
 Li Yifeng as Mao Zedong
 Tong Liya as Zhao Renlan, wife of Li Dazhao.
 Peng Yuchang as Chang Hsueh-liang
 Qin Hao as Chen Duxiu
 Bai Ke as Xu San
 Zhang Ruonan as Li Xinglan
 Xin Yunlai as Deng Zhongxia
 Sun Xilun as Ah Chen

Production 
The planning of The Pioneer was launched in March 2018. The film began production in Shanghai on 27 December 2020.

Release 
The Pioneer was slated for release on 1 July 2021 in China.

Accolades

References

External links 
 
 

2021 films
2020s Mandarin-language films
Chinese biographical drama films
Chinese historical drama films
Films set in Beijing
Films shot in Shanghai
Films set in Shanghai
2021 drama films